Sebastian Árpád Mailat (born 12 December 1997) is a Romanian professional footballer who plays as a winger for Liga I club FC Botoșani.

Club career

Early career / ACS Poli Timișoara
Mailat first came to prominence at age 12, when he won an award for the most technically gifted player for his age group at a national competition organized by Gheorghe Hagi. After playing as a junior for LPS Banatul Timișoara, in the summer of 2015 he attracted the attention of Steaua București coach Mirel Rădoi, but ultimately signed for his hometown club ACS Poli Timișoara.

On 26 May 2016, Mailat made his professional debut in the Liga I and also scored a long range goal in a 2–3 loss to Politehnica Iași.

CFR Cluj
Mailat agreed to a four-year contract with CFR Cluj on 12 November 2017.

Career statistics

Club

Honours
ACS Poli Timișoara
Cupa Ligii runner-up: 2016–17

CFR Cluj
Liga I: 2017–18
Supercupa României: 2018

References

External links

1997 births
Living people
Sportspeople from Timișoara
Romanian footballers
Association football wingers
Liga I players
Liga II players
ACS Poli Timișoara players
CFR Cluj players
CS Gaz Metan Mediaș players
FC Universitatea Cluj players
FC Voluntari players
FC Botoșani players
Romania youth international footballers